This is a list of the National Register of Historic Places listings in Trinity County, Texas.

This is intended to be a complete list of properties listed on the National Register of Historic Places in Trinity County, Texas. There are four properties listed on the National Register in the county. Two properties are designated Recorded Texas Historic Landmarks including one that is also a State Antiquities Landmark.

Current listings

The locations of National Register properties may be seen in a mapping service provided.

|}

Former listing

|}

See also

National Register of Historic Places listings in Texas
Recorded Texas Historic Landmarks in Trinity County

References

External links

Trinity County, Texas
Trinity County
Buildings and structures in Trinity County, Texas